The Mount Clemens Bathers were a minor league baseball team based in Mount Clemens, Michigan. Between 1906 and 1914, the Bathers played as members of the Class D level Southern Michigan League in 1906 and 1907, Border League in 1912 and 1913 and Southern Michigan League in 1914, winning the league championship in 1906. Mount Clemens hosted home minor league teams at Culver Park.

History

1906 & 1907 - Southern Michigan League
The 1906 Mount Clemens Bathers became charter members of the six–team Class D level Southern Michigan League, also called the "Southern Michigan Association". The Battle Creek Crickets, Jackson Convicts, Kalamazoo White Sox, Saginaw and Tecumseh Indians teams joined Mount Clemens as charter members of the league.

The Mount Clemens use of the "Bathers" moniker corresponds to the local landscape and industry in the era. Tourism related to the mineral baths was once a large industry, as at one time, the city had 11 bathhouses and several hotels related to the mineral baths. The first bathhouse was built in 1873. Noted visitors included film actors Clark Gable and Mae West, athletes Babe Ruth and Jack Dempsey, news magnate William Randolph Hearst, and the Vanderbilt family. Today, one spa remains.

Beginning league play on May 6, 1906, the Mount Clemens Bathers won a championship in their first season of minor league play. The Bathers ended the 1906 with a record of 69–34 to place first in the final Southern Michigan League standings. Managed by Walter Trombley, Mount Clemens finished 6.5 games ahead of the second place Kalamazoo White Sox (63–41), who were followed by the Tecumseh Indians (57–47), Jackson Convicts (52–52), Battle Creek Crickets (39–56) and Saginaw (34–60). Bill Roth of Mount Clemens led the league in batting average, hitting. 302 with a league leading 115 hits.

The Mount Clemens Bathers continued play in the 1907 Southern Michigan League. Mount Clemens ended the season in fourth place with a record of 52–51, playing under managers Joe Ganzel and George Thomas. The Bathers finished 13.5 games behind the first place Tecumseh Indians in the eight–team league. John Landry of Mount Clemens led the league with 60 runs, 120 hits and a batting average of .297, while teammate Irwin Gough led the league with 253 strikeouts. Mount Clemens folded from play in Southern Michigan League following the 1907 season.

1912 to 1913 - Border League 
In 1912, the Mount Clemens Bathers returned to minor league play. The Bathers became charter members of the Class D level Border League, which fielded teams from both the United States and Canada. The 1912 five–team league featured the Pontiac Indians, Port Huron Independents, Windsor and Wyandotte Alkalis joining the Mount Clemens in league play.

In their first season of Border League play, the 1912 Mount Clemens Bathers placed third in the league. Beginning play on May 30, 1912, the Mount Clemens ended the 1912 season with a record of 11–15, playing under returning manager Walter Trombley. The Bathers finished 9.0 games behind the first place Wyandotte Alkalis (19–5) in the final standings. The Pontiac Indians (14–9) placed 2nd as the Mount Clemens Bathers (11–15) finished ahead of Windsor (9–14), and Port Huron Independents (7–17) in the final standings.

Mount Clemens pitchers threw no-hitters on back–to–back days in 1912. On August 14, 1912, Thomas Caesar of Mount Clemens threw the first no–hitter in a 12–0 victory over the Myrtle, Ontario team. Teammate Lou North threw a no–hitter against Myrtle the next day. North defeated Myrtle 5–0 on August 15, 1912.

The 1913 Mount Clemens Bathers folded before completing the Border League season. After beginning league play on May 24, 1913, the Bathers had a 7–9 record when the team folded on July 12, 1913. The Bathers were again managed by Walter Trombley as the Ypsilanti, Michigan team eventually won the title in the six–team league. The Border League folded following the 1913 season.

1914
The Mount Clemens Bathers briefly returned to play in 1914 and played their final minor league season. The franchise returned to membership in the Southern Michigan League on July 10, 1914, when the Lansing Senators of Lansing, Michigan, with a record of 33-35, moved to Mount Clemens to complete the season. The Lansing/Mount Clemens team finished with an overall record of 63–80 after compiling a 30–45 record while based in Mount Clemens. Playing under manager Jack Morrissey, the Bathers finished 29.0 games behind the 1st place Bay City Beavers in the final standing of the ten–team league. The Southern Michigan League permanently folded following the 1914 season with the onset of World War II.

On August 21, 1914, Bravener of Mount Clemens threw an 11–inning no–hitter in a Southern Michigan League game against the Battle Creek Crickets. Bravener and Mount Clemens won the game 1–0.

Mount Clemens, Michigan has not hosted another minor league team.

The ballpark
The Mount Clemens Bathers teams played home minor league games at Culver Park. The ballpark was also called "Crocker Field." The ballpark was located on Rathbone Street & Crocker Boulevard near the Clinton River.

Timeline

Year-by–year records

Notable alumni

Cliff Daringer (1907)
Tom McCarthy (1906)
Jack Morrissey (1914, MGR)
Lou North (1912)
Jack Ryan (1906)
Vern Spencer (1914)

See also
Mount Clemens Bathers players

References

External links
 Baseball Reference

Defunct minor league baseball teams
Defunct baseball teams in Michigan
Baseball teams established in 1906
Baseball teams disestablished in 1914
Border League teams
Macomb County, Michigan
Southern Michigan League teams